Andrés Neubauer (17 April 1908 – 9 February 1992) was a Chilean fencer. He competed in the individual sabre event at the 1948 Summer Olympics.

References

External links
 

1908 births
1992 deaths
Chilean male sabre fencers
Olympic fencers of Chile
Fencers at the 1948 Summer Olympics
20th-century Chilean people